In taxonomy, Methanolobus is a genus of methanogenic archaea within the Methanosarcinaceae. These organisms are strictly anaerobes and live exclusively through the production of methane, but the species within Methanolobus cannot use carbon dioxide with hydrogen, acetate or formate, only methyl compounds. The cells are irregular coccoid in form and approximately 1 μm in diameter. They do not form endospores. They are Gram negative and only some are motile, via a single flagellum. They are found in lake and ocean sediments that lack oxygen.

References

Further reading

Scientific journals

Scientific books

Scientific databases

External links

Archaea genera
Euryarchaeota